Events in the year 1892 in Venezuela.

Incumbents
President: Raimundo Andueza Palacio until June 17, Guillermo Tell Villegas until August 31, Guillermo Tell Villegas Pulido until October 7, Joaquin Crespo

Events
September 17 - inauguration of new psychiatric hospital in Caracas

Births

Deaths

1890s in Venezuela